Beaver Towers: The Dangerous Journey is a novel by British author Nigel Hinton which was first published in 1986. It is the third installment in the Beaver Towers series between Beaver Towers: the Witch's Revenge and Beaver Towers: the Dark Dream. It was originally titled Run to Beaver Towers but was renamed when Puffin Books published it in April 1997. It follows the story of Philip whose friends Baby B and Nick appeared in his house and their journey together to Beaver Towers.

Concept
The author liked the idea of Philip learning new powers and how to use them and decided to work from there.

References

1986 British novels
1986 children's books
British children's books
British children's novels
British fantasy novels
Children's fantasy novels
Children's novels about animals
Talking animals in fiction
Beaver Towers Series